The 2006 San Diego Toreros football team represented the University of San Diego as a member of the Pioneer Football League (PFL) during the 2006 NCAA Division I FCS football season. In their third and final year under head coach Jim Harbaugh, the Toreros compiled an 11–1 record, outscored their opponents 514 to 155, and won the PFL championship.

Schedule

References

2006 Pioneer Football League season
San Diego Toreros football seasons
Pioneer Football League champion seasons
San Diego Toreros football